15th Congress may refer to:

 15th Congress of the All-Union Communist Party (Bolsheviks) (1927)
 15th Congress of the Philippines (2010–2013)
 15th National Congress of the Chinese Communist Party (1997)
 15th National Congress of the Kuomintang (1997)
 15th People's Party of Kazakhstan Extraordinary Congress (2020)
 15th United States Congress (1817–1819)